California's 53rd congressional district was a congressional district in the U.S. state of California.  It was last represented by Sara Jacobs, who succeeded Susan Davis following the 2020 election. It was eliminated following the 2020 United States redistricting cycle.

The district was recently in San Diego County. It included eastern portions of Chula Vista, western portions of El Cajon, central and eastern portions of the city of San Diego, as well as eastern suburbs such as Bonita, La Mesa, Lemon Grove, and Spring Valley in their entirety.

Competitiveness

In statewide races

Future
The district was abolished following the 2020 United States census. It was the first congressional seat to be lost after a census in California's history.

List of members representing the district

Election results

2002

2004

2006

2008

2010

2012

2014

2016

2018

2020

See also

List of United States congressional districts
United States congressional delegations from California

References

External links
District information at GovTrack.us
Michael Crimmins 2008 & 2010 Republican Congressional Candidate

53
Government of San Diego County, California
Government of San Diego
East County (San Diego County)
Chula Vista, California
El Cajon, California
La Mesa, California
Lemon Grove, California
Constituencies established in 2003
2003 establishments in California
Constituencies disestablished in 2023
2023 disestablishments in California